Hnin is a Burmese name that may refer to the following notable people:
Khine Hnin Wai (born 1981), Burmese actress, philanthropist, and an activist for victims of child rape
May Hnin Thwe-Da, 13th-century Burmese woman
Mya Hnin Yee Lwin (born 1987), Burmese television and film actress
Khin Hnin Yu (1925–2003), Burmese writer
Wai Hnin Pwint Thon (born 1989), Burmese activist based in London
Hnin Mya (1887–1974), Burmese politician
Khin Hnin Kyi Thar (born 1986), Burmese philanthropist, journalist and writer
May Hnin Theindya, principal queen consort of King Tarabya of Pegu
Hnin Thway Yu Aung (born 1996), Burmese model and beauty queen
Hnin U Yaing (c. 1260s – 1310s), princess of Martaban
May Hnin Htapi), 14th-century Burmese woman

Burmese-language surnames
Burmese-language given names
Surnames of Burmese origin